Nguyễn Thị Hạnh (born 20 September 1986) is a Vietnamese retired footballer who played as a midfielder. She is also a former futsal player who played as a defender, and represented Vietnam internationally in both football and futsal.

International career
Nguyễn Thị Hạnh has been capped for Vietnam at senior level in both football and futsal. In football, she represented Vietnam in multiple competitions, namely the  2010 AFC Women's Asian Cup and the 2012 AFC Women's Pre-Olympic Tournament.

In futsal, Nguyễn Thị Hạnh played for Vietnam at the AFC Women's Futsal Championship in 2018.

References

1986 births
Living people
Vietnamese women's footballers
Women's association football midfielders
Vietnam women's international footballers
Vietnamese women's futsal players
Futsal defenders
21st-century Vietnamese women